The 1968–69 Sussex County Football League season was the 44th in the history of Sussex County Football League, a football competition in England.

Division One

Division One featured 14 clubs which competed in the division last season, along with two new clubs, promoted from Division Two:
Whitehawk
Wigmore Athletic

League table

Division Two

Division Two featured 13 clubs which competed in the division last season, along with two new clubs, relegated from Division One:
Lancing
Newhaven

League table

References

1968-69
S